A business case captures the reasoning for initiating a project or task. It is often presented in a well-structured written document, but may also come in the form of a short verbal agreement or presentation. The logic of the business case is that, whenever resources such as money or effort are consumed, they should be in support of a specific business need. An example could be that a software upgrade might improve system performance, but the "business case" is that better performance would improve customer satisfaction, require less task processing time, or reduce system maintenance costs. A compelling business case adequately captures both the quantifiable and non-quantifiable characteristics of a proposed project.

Business cases can range from comprehensive and highly structured, as required by formal project management methodologies, to informal and brief. Information included in a formal business case could be the background of the project, the expected business benefits, the options considered (with reasons for rejecting or carrying forward each option), the expected costs of the project, a gap analysis and the expected risks. Consideration should also be given to the option of doing nothing including the costs and risks of inactivity. From this information, the justification for the project is derived.

Reasons for creating a business case

Business cases are created to help decision-makers ensure that:
 the proposed initiative will have value and relative priority compared to alternative initiatives based on the objectives and expected benefits laid out in the business case.

 the performance indicators found in the business case are identified to be used for proactive realization of the business and behavioral change.

Development and approval process

The business case process should be designed to be:
 adaptable – tailored to the size and risk of the proposal
 consistent – the same basic business issues are addressed by every project
 business oriented – concerned with the business capabilities and impact, rather than having a technical focus
 comprehensive – includes all factors relevant to a complete evaluation
 understandable – the contents are clearly relevant, logical and, although demanding, are simple to complete and evaluate
 measurable – all key aspects can be quantified so their achievement can be tracked and measured
 transparent – key elements can be justified directly
 accountable – accountability and commitments for the delivery of benefits and management of costs are clear.

Key elements of the business case report
A good business case report, which brings confidence and accountability into the field of making investment decisions, is a compilation of all information collected during enterprise analysis and the business case process. The key purpose is to provide evidence and justification for continuing with the investment proposition. Here is a recommended structure:
 Preface
 Table of contents
 Executive briefing
 Recommendation
 Summary of results
 Decision to be taken
 Introduction
 Business drivers
 Scope
 Financial metrics
 Analysis
 Assumptions
 Cash flow statement (net present value, etc.)
 Costs
 Benefits
 Risk
 Strategic options
 Opportunity costs
 Conclusion, recommendation, and next steps
 Appendix

Review and approval
At various stages in the project, the business case should be reviewed to ensure that:
 The justification is still valid,
 The project will deliver the solution to the business need.

The result of a review may be the termination or amendment of the project. The business case may also be subject to amendment if the review concludes that the business need has abated or changed, this will have a knock on effect on the project.

Public sector projects
Many public sector projects are now required to justify their need through a business case. In the public sector, the business case is argued in terms of Cost–benefit analysis, which may include both financial and non-financial cost and benefits. This allows the business to take into account societal and environmental benefits, allowing a more comprehensive understanding of economic impacts.

See also 
 Business plan
 Project charter

 Case competition
 Innovation
 Optimism bias
 Planning fallacy
 Reference class forecasting
 Win-win

Notes

References 
Bentley, C.: Practical Prince2 (The Stationery Office), .

Five elements to include in a compelling business case 

Messner, W.: Making the Compelling Business Case. Decision-Making Techniques for Successful Business Growth. Houndmills: Palgrave Macmillan, 2013 (book companion website)

OGC Guidance and templates on 'Business Case'

Schaltegger, S. & Wagner, M. (Eds.): Managing the Business Case for Sustainability. The Integration of Social things, and Economic Performance. Sheffield: Greenleaf, 2006

External links 
Business Case article in PRINCE2 wiki

Project management
Evaluation methods

ru:Технико-экономическое обоснование